Bony a klid is a Czech drama film directed by Vít Olmer. It was released in 1987.

Plot
The film is set in Prague. Martin, a young man from Mladá Boleslav, becomes a victim of a fraud committed by Richard, a currency dealer (trading foreign currencies was illegal in Czechoslovakia during the socialist era). Seeking to get his money back, he attempts to track Richard down and eventually joins his gang, consisting of Hary, Bíny and Slepejš. He quickly adapts to the lifestyle of big money, debauched parties, prostitutes, and police raids. Bíny betrays one of their deals to a rival gang, led by Karel, and they find themselves on the run from the police. They attempt to seek shelter in Mladá Boleslav, but are eventually found and during the chase, Hary falls to his death from a balcony. The gang appears in court and is sentenced to serve jail time. It is strongly suggested that Karel has an influence over the judge.

Cast
 Jan Potměšil - Martin
 Veronika Jeníková - Eva
 Josef Nedorost - Richard
 Tomáš Hanák - Hary
 Roman Skamene - Bíny
 Miloslav Kopečný - Slepejš
 Vítězslav Jirsák - Martin's Father
 Milos Čálek - Benák
 František Švihlík - Karel

Music
The music in the film is by the band Frankie Goes To Hollywood (Relax, The Power of Love, The World is My Oyster), and by Charles Shaw & Silvia Brown (Hold Me Baby and I Leave It Up To You).

External links
 

1987 films
1980s Czech-language films
1987 drama films
Czech drama films
Czechoslovak drama films
1980s Czech films